E300 or E-300 may refer to:
 Brandner E-300, an Egyptian turbojet engine
 HB-E300 series, a Japanese hybrid diesel train type
 Olympus E-300, a digital camera manufactured by Olympus
 PowerPC e300, a family of microprocessor cores
 Ascorbic acid, a compound numbered E300 in the European food additive E number system
 Eurostar e300, a class of Eurostar passenger trains also known as British Rail Class 373 and TGV TMST
 Extra 300 , an acrobatic monoplane